K. P. Kumaran is an Indian film maker who works in the Malayalam cinema. He co-authored the script of Swayamvaram directed by Adoor Gopalakrishnan. Kumaran's first directorial venture was Athithi. His major films include Rugmini (winner of the 1989 National Film Award for Best Feature Film in Malayalam), Thenthulli, Laxmivijayam and Thottam. His latest film, Akasha Gopuram, is based on Henrik Ibsen's play The Master Builder.

Kumaran's first directorial venture was Rock (short film), which won an international award. His first feature film was Adhithi. He won the J. C. Daniel Award for 2021.

Filmography
Rock (short film)
Athithi (debut feature film)
Rugmini
Thenthulli
Laxmivijayam
Thottam
Akasha Gopuram (2008)
Swayamvaram (1972) (as co-scriptwriter)

Awards and honours
In 2022, for his overall contribution to the Malayalam film industry, he received J. C. Daniel Award, the highest honour in Malayalam cinema.

References

External links
 

Film directors from Kerala
Living people
Malayalam film directors
Indian male screenwriters
Malayalam screenwriters
Kerala State Film Award winners
Screenwriters from Kerala
20th-century Indian film directors
21st-century Indian film directors
Year of birth missing (living people)